Marasmarcha sisyrodes is a moth of the family Pterophoridae. It is known from Cameroon, the Democratic Republic of Congo and Zimbabwe.

References

Exelastini
Lepidoptera of Cameroon
Lepidoptera of the Democratic Republic of the Congo
Lepidoptera of Zimbabwe
Moths of Sub-Saharan Africa
Moths described in 1921